The European Journal of Theology (French: Journal Européen de Théologie, German: Europäische Theologische Zeitschrift) is a biannual peer-reviewed academic journal covering evangelical theology. Contributions are in English, French, or German, with summaries in all three languages. The journal was established in 1992 and is published by Amsterdam University Press on behalf of the Fellowship of European Evangelical Theologians. The editor-in-chief is Pieter J. Lalleman (Spurgeon's College). Previous editors have been Nigel M. de S. Cameron, J. Gordon McConville, Mark W. Elliott, and Jamie Grant.

Abstracting and indexing
The journal is abstracted and indexed in:
ATLA Religion Database
ERIH PLUS
Scopus

References

External links

Multilingual journals
Publications established in 1992
Protestant studies journals
Biannual journals